Viktoriya Oleksandrivna Koval (born June 11, 1985) is an athlete from Ukraine who competes in archery.

2008 Summer Olympics
At the 2008 Summer Olympics in Beijing Koval finished her ranking round with a total of 641 points. This gave her the 21st seed for the final competition bracket in which she faced Barbora Horáčková in the first round, beating the archer from the Czech Republic with 109–107. In the second round she was eliminated by 12th seed Aida Román with 111–105.

References

1985 births
Living people
Olympic archers of Ukraine
Archers at the 2008 Summer Olympics
Ukrainian female archers
National University of Kharkiv alumni
Universiade medalists in archery
Universiade bronze medalists for Ukraine
Medalists at the 2005 Summer Universiade
Medalists at the 2009 Summer Universiade
21st-century Ukrainian women